Christopher Lee Yost (born February 21, 1973) is an American film, television, animation, and comic book writer best known for his work for Marvel Studios' Marvel Cinematic Universe with Thor: The Dark World (2013) and Thor: Ragnarok (2017) and on The Mandalorian for Lucasfilm and Disney+.

Career
Yost graduated from the University of Michigan in 1995 with a film and video degree and got into advertising in the Detroit area, producing TV commercials. He went on to earn an MFA in film from The Peter Stark Producing Program at the University of Southern California and later interned, in 2002, in Marvel Comics' west coast office. His spec film scripts got attention from Marvel executives who hired Yost to write episodes of the TV series X-Men: Evolution.

Yost has also written for animated shows such as Teenage Mutant Ninja Turtles, The Batman and was the story editor and head writer on the Fantastic Four animated series that aired on Cartoon Network in 2006 as well as Iron Man: Armored Adventures. He was the head writer of Marvel Animation's The Avengers: Earth's Mightiest Heroes, which aired on Disney XD from 2010 to 2012, and has worked on Lucasfilm's Star Wars: Rebels on Disney XD.

Yost worked in the Marvel Feature Film Writers Program from 2010 to 2012 before embarking on his feature film screenwriting career. He was one of the writers of Marvel's feature film Thor: The Dark World (2013), and then wrote Mattel's film Max Steel, before returning to Marvel to work on Thor: Ragnarok.

On June 6, 2017, it was announced that Yost would write an American live-action adaptation of Cowboy Bebop for television with Tomorrow Studios, a partnership between Marty Adelstein and Sunrise Inc., which also produced the original anime. Additionally, he worked on The Mandalorian for Lucasfilm and Disney+.

Filmography

Film
 Next Avengers: Heroes of Tomorrow (2008)
 Hulk Vs. (2009)
 Thor: The Dark World (2013)
 Max Steel (2016)
 Thor: Ragnarok (2017)
 Secret Headquarters (2022)

Television

TV animation
X-Men: Evolution (writer)
3.11 "X23" (story by Craig Kyle, co-written with Craig Kyle), 2003
3.12 "Dark Horizon Part 1" (co-written with Craig Kyle), 2003
3.13 "Dark Horizon Part 2" (co-written with Craig Kyle), 2003
4.03 "Target X" (co-written with Craig Kyle), 2003
The Batman (writer)
1.07 "The Big Heat" (co-written with J.D Murray), 2004
2.02 "Riddled" (co-written with J.D Murray), 2005
2.06 "The Pets" (co-written with J.D Murray), 2005
3.04 "RPM", 2005
Teenage Mutant Ninja Turtles (writer)
3.19 "Reality Check", 2005
3.22 "The Real World Part 1", 2005
3.25 "Exodus Part 1", 2005
4.01 "Cousin Sid", 2005
4.06 "Grudge Match", 2005
4.09 "Aliens Among Us", 2005
4.13 "Samurai Tourist", 2005
4.17 "Outbreak", 2006
4.20 "Return of Savanti Part 1", 2006
4.21 "Return of Savanti Part 2", 2006
4.24 "Good Genes Part 1", 2006
4.25 "Good Genes Part 2", 2006
5.01 "Lap of the Gods", 2008
5.04 "More Worlds Than One", 2008
5.07 "Membership Drive", 2008
5.12 "Enter the Dragons Part 1", 2008
5.13 "Enter the Dragons Part 2", 2008
Legend of the Dragon (writer)
1.16 "Shell Game", 2006
Alien Racers (writer)
1.18 "Skrash and Burn", 2006
Fantastic Four: World's Greatest Heroes (head writer, story editor)
1.03 "Doomsday" (story by Craig Kyle), 2006
1.12 "Annihilation" (story by Craig Kyle), 2007
1.18 "The Cure" (story by Craig Kyle & Dan Slott), 2007
1.26 "Scavenger Hunt", 2007
Wolverine and the X-Men (writer)
1.07 "Wolverine vs. Hulk", 2008 (story by Greg Johnson, Craig Kyle & Christopher Yost)
1.09 "Future X", 2008 (story by Greg Johnson & Craig Kyle)
1.10 "Greetings from Genosha", 2008 (story by Greg Johnson & Craig Kyle)
1.12 "Excessive Force", 2008 (story by Greg Johnson, Craig Kyle & Christopher Yost)
1.13 "Battle Lines", 2009 (story by Greg Johnson, Craig Kyle & Christopher Yost)
1.14 "Stolen Lives", 2009 (story only, with Greg Johnson & Craig Kyle)
1.15 "Hunting Grounds", 2009 (story only, with Greg Johnson & Craig Kyle)
1.16 "Badlands", 2009 (story only, with Greg Johnson & Craig Kyle)
1.18 "Backlash", 2009 (story by Greg Johnson, Craig Kyle & Christopher Yost)
1.19 "Guardian Angel", 2009 (story only, with Greg Johnson & Craig Kyle)
Iron Man: Armored Adventures (head writer, story editor)
1.01 "Iron Forged in Fire Part 1", 2009
1.02 "Iron Forged in Fire Part 2", 2009
1.12 "Seeing Red", 2009
1.19 "Technovore", 2009 (story only)
1.25 "Tales of Suspense Part 1", 2009
1.26 "Tales of Suspense Part 2", 2009
The Avengers: Earth's Mightiest Heroes (head writer, story editor)
1.05 "The Man in the Ant Hill", 2010
1.06 "Breakout Part 1", 2010
1.07 "Breakout Part 2", 2010
1.14 "Masters of Evil", 2010
1.25 "The Fall of Asgard", 2011
1.26 "A Day Unlike Any Other", 2011
2.01 "The Private War of Doctor Doom", 2012
2.11 "Infiltration", 2012
2.12 "Secret Invasion", 2012
2.13 "Along Came a Spider...", 2012
2.17 "Ultron Unlimited", 2012
2.19 "Emperor Stark", 2012
2.23 "New Avengers", 2012
2.24 "Operation Galactic Storm", 2012
2.25 "Live Kree or Die", 2012
2.26 "Avengers Assemble", 2012
Teenage Mutant Ninja Turtles (writer)
2.19 "The Wrath of Tiger Claw", 2014
Star Wars Rebels (writer)
3.07 "Imperial Supercommandos", 2016
3.16 "Legacy of Mandalore", 2017
4.02 "Heroes of Mandalore Part 2", 2017
4.05 "The Occupation", 2017
4.11 "DUME", 2017 (with Dave Filoni)
Star Wars The Bad Batch (writer)
2.05 "Entombed", 2023

Bibliography

Comics
Marvel Comics
 Avengers
Avengers: Earth's Mightiest Heroes #1-4 (art by Scott Wegener, 2010–2011)
Spider-Island: Avengers #1 (art by Mike McKone, 2011)
Avengers Prelude #1-4 (co-written by Eric Pearson, 2012)
Marvel Universe Avengers: Earth's Mightiest Heroes #1-7 (2012)
AvsX #3 (writer of Black Widow vs. Magik story, 2012)
A+X #7 (writer of Thor/Iceman story, 2013)
 Spider-Man
 Spider-Man Unlimited Vol. 3 #9 (first story only, with pencils by Drew Johnson, 2005)
 The Many Loves of The Amazing Spider-Man #1 (Black Cat story only with art by Michael Ryan, 2010)
 Fear Itself: Spider-Man #1-3 (art by Mike McKone, 2011)
 Scarlet Spider #1-25 (art by Ryan Stegman, Khoi Pham, 2012–2013)
 Avenging Spider-Man #15.1-22 (art by Paco Medina, Marco Checchetto, 2013)
 Superior Spider-Man Team-Up #1-2, 5-8 (2013-2014)
X-23
X-23: Innocence Lost #1-6 (with co-writer Craig Kyle and art by Billy Tan, 2005)
X-23: Target X (with co-writer Craig Kyle and art by Mike Choi, 2007)
X-Force
X-Force #1-28 (with co-writer Craig Kyle, Marvel Comics, 2008–2010)
X-Force/Cable: Messiah War #1 (with co-writer Craig Kyle and art by Mike Choi, 2009)
X-Force: Sex and Violence #1-3 (with co-writer Craig Kyle and art by Gabriele Dell'Otto, 2010)
X-Men
X-Men Unlimited Vol. 2 #11 (first story only, with pencils by Billy Dallas Patton, 2005)
New X-Men #20-46 (with co-writer Craig Kyle, 2006–2008)
X-Men: Emperor Vulcan #1-5 (with pencils by Paco Diaz and Vincente Cifuentes, 2008)
X-Men Origins: Colossus #1 (with penciles by Trevor Hairsine, 2008)
X-Men: Divided We Stand #1 (Gentle and Hellion stories only, 2008)
X-Men: Worlds Apart #1-4 (art by Diogene Neves, Marvel Comics, 2008–2009)
X-Men: Kingbreaker #1-4 (with Dustin Weaver, Marvel Comics, 2008–2009)
Dark X-Men: The Confession #1 (with co-writer Craig Kyle and art by Yanick Paquette, 2009)
Psylocke #1-4 (art by Harvey Tolibao, 2009–2010)
Nation X #1, 3 (#1 Iceman story only; #3 Box & Diamond Lil story only, 2010)
X-Men: Second Coming #1-2 (#1 with co-writer Craig Kyle and art by David Finch; #2 with co-writers Matt Fraction, Mike Carey and Zeb Wells and art by Adi Granov, 2010)
X-Men: Second Coming – Revelations: Hellbound #1-3 (with Harvey Tolibao, 2010)
X-Men: To Serve and Protect #1-4 (X-Vigilante's story only 2010–2011)
X-Men Giant Size #1 (First to Last Part 1, art by Paco Medina and Dalibor Talajic, 2011)
X-Men #12-15 (First to Last, art by Paco Medina and Dalibor Talajic, 2011)
Amazing X-Men #8-12, 14-18 (with co-writer Craig Kyle and art by Ed McGuinness, Carlo Barberi, 2014–2015)
Nick Fury
Fury's Big Week #1-3 (2012)
Other Marvel
Wolverine: Killing Made Simple (first story only, with pencils by Koi Turnbull, 2008)
Secret Invasion: Runaways/Young Avengers #1-3 (art by Takeshi Miyazawa, 2008)
Runaways Vol. 3 #10 (with co-writer James Asmus and art by Sara Pichelli & Emma Rios, Marvel Comics, 2009)
Marvel Assistant-Sized Spectacular #2 (writer of the Elsa Bloodstone story, Marvel Comics, 2009)
Ender's Game: Battle School #1-5 (art by Pasqual Ferry, 2009)
Ender's Game: Command School #1-5 (art by Pasqual Ferry, 2009–2010)
Breaking Into Comics the Marvel Way! #1 (X-Men story only with art by Paul Davidson, 2010)
Battle Scars #1-6 (art by Scot Eaton, 2011)
Point One #1 (art by Ryan Stegman, 2011)
New Warriors Vol. 5 #1-12 (with art by Marcus To, 2014)
M.O.D.O.K. Assassin #1-5 (art by Amilcar Pinna, 2015)
DC Comics
Batman: Battle for the Cowl - The Underground #1 (with art by Pablo Raimondi, 2009)
Red Robin #1 - 12 (with art by Ramon Bachs, 2009–2010)
Titans #16 (with art by Angel Unzueta, 2009)
Batman: Streets of Gotham #5-6 (main feature, with art by Dustin Nguyen, 2009)
Image Comics
Killer of Demons #1-3 (Art by Scott Wegener 2009)

References

External links

Living people
American comics writers
American male screenwriters
Writers from St. Louis
1973 births
University of Michigan School of Music, Theatre & Dance alumni
Screenwriters from Missouri